GBA-10 (Skardu-IV) is a constituency of Gilgit Baltistan Assembly which is currently represented by Raja Nasir Ali Khan.

Members

Election results

2009
Wazir Hussain of PPP became member of assembly by getting 3,578 votes.

2015
Captain Sikandar of Islami Tehreek Pakistan won this seat by getting 4,949 votes.

References

Gilgit-Baltistan Legislative Assembly constituencies